Bazyl Jakupov (4 January 1965 – 5 October 2021) was a Kazakh politician and agronomist.

References

1965 births
2021 deaths
Kazakhstani agronomists
Nur Otan politicians
People from Akmola Region